Cradle is the only album by the English pop group Acacia, which featured future record producer Guy Sigsworth (Madonna, Alanis Morissette, others) and singer Alexander "Blackmoth" Nilere. It is notable for being the first full album released by Sigsworth as both full group member and producer (following his work as keyboard player with Björk and Seal) and for being the first record to heavily feature later solo artist Imogen Heap (who performs on all but one track).

Details and history
The majority of the album was recorded by Sigsworth and Nilere (with Heap as backing singer and constant musical foil, although not a full band member). Two Acacia live musicians (Luca Ramelli and Eshan K) were also credited as part of the band. Two former Acacia live members (Maurizio Anzalone and Ansuman Biswas) actually performed on more of the album tracks than their successors did, but had left the band by the time of the album releases and were therefore credited only as guest musicians. Much of the album's guitar playing was in fact generated by Sigworth's sampler.

The album also features appearances from Colette Meury (Choc Electrique), Loretta Haywood (L.a.z.y.), Ragnhildur "Ragga" Gísladóttir (Tricky, Ragga & The Jack Magic Orchestra), Steve Mack (That Petrol Emotion) and Andrew Tumi (later known as "One" and as part of Supafly).

Cradle was released in 1997 but almost immediately withdrawn due to legal disputes between Warner Music UK and the band's former label Radar Records (although some copies of the album did arrive in the shops and were sold). Fifteen years later in 2012, the band had regained rights to the album and it was re-released via iTunes in May 2012 (followed by an iTunes reissue of the "Maddening Shroud" single in September).

Track listing

Cover versions
"I'm in Love with Love" is a cover version of a song by the British hard rock/funk band The Holiday Patrons (originally released as the B-side to their 1984 debut single "Hottest Time of the Year").

"The More You Ignore Me, the Closer I Get" is a cover version of a Morrissey song from the 1994 album Vauxhall and I (the original version was also a number 8 hit single in the UK Singles Chart during 1994)

"Maddening Shroud" was later covered by Frou Frou, the pop duo set up by Sigsworth and Imogen Heap (the song appears on the lone Frou Frou album Details).

Personnel
Acacia:

Alexander Nilere - voice
Guy Sigsworth - synthesizer; sampler; guitar facsimile (synthesized guitar) on all tracks except "Maddening Shroud", "Hate", "You Nothing" & "Wire"; piano on "You Nothing" & "Wire"
Luca Ramelli - guitar on "I'm in Love with Love" & "Maddening Shroud"
Eshan K (Eshan Khadaroo) - drums on "I'm in Love with Love"
and
Ansuman Biswas - berimbau & ektara & toys on "The More You Ignore Me, The Closer I Get", santoor on "Unfulfilled Desire", cymbals & bells & hi-hat on "Yellow is the Colour of My Cowardice"
Maurizio Anzalone - guitar on "The More You Ignore Me, the Closer I Get", "Sway", "Unfulfilled Desire", "Sympathy", "Hate", "Boils Down to Money" & "Woe Woe Song"

Guest musicians:

Imogen Heap - backing vocals on all tracks except "Wire"
Colette Meury - backing vocals on "Wired" & "Yellow is the Colour of My Cowardice"
Ragga (Ragnhildur Gísladóttir) - backing vocals on "The More You Ignore Me, The Closer I Get"
Loretta Heywood - backing vocals on "Maddening Shroud"
Andrew Tumi - backing vocals on "You Nothing"
Lisa Ferguson - violin on "Unfulfilled Desire"
Steve Mack - guitar on "Yellow is the Colour of My Cowardice"

References 

1997 albums
Albums produced by Guy Sigsworth